The Pro Challenge Series was a series of non-ranking snooker tournaments held during the 2009–10 snooker season. The events were open to all players on the main tour and were intended to give tour players more playing opportunities. Seven events were planned but only four took place before the series was cancelled, due to low player participation. The series was not repeated and was replaced by the Players Tour Championship, which started the following season.

Prize fund 
Except for event 2, events had a prize fund of £15,000 with the winner receiving £5,000. Event 2, which was played using the six-red format, had a prize fund of £10,000 with the winner receiving £3,000. In event 2 the £500 break prize went to the player with the fastest maximum break.

Schedule 

The schedule for the Events 1 to 5 is listed below. Event 4 was cancelled and event 5 was the final tournament played. Event 2 was played using the six-red format. Events 6 and 7 were cancelled.

Event 1

Prize fund

 Winner: £5,000
 Runner-up: £2,500
 Semi-final: £1,500
 Quarter-final: £500
 Last 16: £250
 High break: £500

The first event took place at the Northern Snooker Centre in Leeds, from 28 to 30 July 2009. Stephen Maguire beat Ken Doherty 5–2 in the final. Dave Harold made the highest break of 128. Results are given below.

Preliminary round

 0–4 
 2–4 
 3–4 
 4–0 
 w/o–w/d 
 4–1 
 1–4 
 3–4

Century breaks

128  Dave Harold
127  Ken Doherty
126  Andrew Norman
115  Ricky Walden
107  Mark Boyle
107  Stephen Maguire
106  Matthew Couch
100  Tom Ford
100  Joe Swail

Event 2

Prize fund

 Winner: £3,000
 Runner-up: £1,500
 Semi-finals: £800
 Quarter-Finals: £400
 Last 16: £225
 Fastest maximum break (x75): £500

The second event took place at Pontins, Prestatyn, on 31 August and 1 September 2009, using the six-red format. Ken Doherty beat Martin Gould 6–2 in the final. Stuart Pettman took the prize for the fastest maximum break. Results are given below.

Preliminary round

 2–5 
 4–5 
 3–5 
 w/o-w/d 
 2–5 
 5–2 
 5–0 
 w/d–w/o 
 4–5 
 4–5 
 1–5 
 4–5 
 1–5 
 3–5 
 2–5

Maximum breaks
Note: a maximum break in six-red snooker is 75 points.

Stuart Pettman (2 min 31 sec)
Dave Harold (3 min 16 sec)
Fergal O'Brien (4 min 30 sec)
Ryan Day (no time)

Event 3

Prize fund

 Winner: £5,000
 Runner-up: £2,500
 Semi-final: £1,500
 Quarter-final: £500
 Last 16: £250
 High break: £500

The third event took place at the Willie Thorne Snooker Centre in Leicester, from 9 to 11 November 2009. Robert Milkins beat Joe Jogia 5–3 in the final. Ricky Walden made the highest break of 140. Results are given below.

Preliminary round

 3–4 
 1–4 
 4–0 
 3–4 
 w/d–w/o 
 4–2 
 4–2 
 4–0 
 w/d–w/o 
 1–4 
 4–3 
 4–1 
 1–4 
 2–4 
 3–4 
 2–4 
 4–2 
 2–4 
 4–2 
 4–3

Century breaks

 140, 105, 103, 102, 102, 100  Ricky Walden
 137, 118  Robert Milkins
 137  Simon Bedford
 137  Craig Steadman
 129  Jamie Cope
 125, 104  Stuart Bingham
 123, 116, 102  Judd Trump
 121  Rod Lawler
 120  Ken Doherty
 113, 103  Sam Baird
 113  Liu Song
 110  Mark King
 107  Matthew Couch
 102  Joe Jogia

Event 5

Prize fund

 Winner: £5,000
 Runner-up: £2,500
 Semi-final: £1,500
 Quarter-final: £500
 Last 16: £250
 High break: £500

Event 5 took place at the George Scott Snooker Club in Liverpool, from 16 to 18 February 2010. Barry Hawkins beat Michael Holt 5–1 in the final. Judd Trump made the highest break of 138. Results are given below.

Preliminary round

 4–2 
 2–4 
 1–4 
 1–4 
 w/d–w/o 
 0–4 
 2–4

Century breaks

 138  Judd Trump
 137  Ken Doherty
 135, 129, 121  Liang Wenbo
 134  Rod Lawler
 132, 128, 104  Stuart Bingham
 131  Graeme Dott
 130  Craig Steadman
 128, 105  Tom Ford
 125  Nigel Bond
 124  Mark Joyce
 123, 106  Barry Hawkins
 122  Jamie Cope
 122  Adrian Gunnell
 109, 102  Michael Holt
 106  Simon Bedford
 104, 100  Daniel Wells

References 

Snooker non-ranking competitions
Snooker competitions in the United Kingdom
Snooker tours and series
2009 in snooker
2010 in snooker
2009 in English sport
2009 in Welsh sport
2010 in English sport